Archie Harris may refer to:

 Archie Harris (athlete) (1918–1965), American discus thrower
 Archie Harris (American football) (born 1964), American football player